The 2017 World Series of Darts is a series of televised darts tournaments organised by the Professional Darts Corporation. In 2017, there are 7 World Series events and one finals event.

Prize money

International events

Final

World Series events

World Series qualifiers 

Shanghai Masters
  Royden Lam
  Haruki Muramatsu
  Paul Lim
  Hyun-chul Park
  Wei-Hong Li
  Hai-Long Chen
  Zong Xiao Chen
  Cheng-Au Lin

US Masters
  Willard Bruguier
  Shawn Brenneman
  Jayson Barlow
  Chris White
  DJ Sayre
  Dave Richardson
  Dawson Murschell
  David Cameron

Auckland Masters
  Rob Szabo
  Warren Parry
  Cody Harris
  Rob Modra
  Corey Cadby
  Kyle Anderson
  Mark Cleaver
  Darren Herewini

Melbourne Masters
  Dave Marland
  Koha Kokiri
  Corey Cadby
  Cody Harris
  Rhys Mathewson
  Justin Thompson
  Kyle Anderson
  David Platt

Perth Masters
  Adam Rowe
  Kyle Anderson
  Darren Hayes
  Koha Kokiri
  Rhys Mathewson
  Corey Cadby
  Rob Szabo
  Justin Thompson

German Masters
  Mensur Suljović
  Max Hopp
  Martin Schindler
  Maik Langendorf
  Stefan Stoyke
  Robert Marijanović
  Kevin Münch
  Dragutin Horvat

Quarter-finalists

References 

World Series of Darts